This is a list of University of Melbourne people, including alumni and staff.

Alumni

Academia 

Sir John Behan, educator; Australia's first Rhodes Scholar
Geoff Bowker, professor of informatics at the University of California, Irvine
Alec Broers, Baron Broers, electrical engineer, former Vice Chancellor of the University of Cambridge
Karen Burns, architectural historian
Joseph Camilleri, professor at La Trobe University
Simon Chesterman, Dean of Law at the National University of Singapore
Michael Clyne, linguist
Greg Craven, Vice-Chancellor of Australian Catholic University
John Deeble, Architect of Medicare Australia
Ding Dyason, medical historian
Alan Ebringer, immunologist, professor at King's College in the University of London
Arie Freiberg, legal academic
Germaine Greer, feminist
Maria Gough, art historian at Harvard University
Bella Guerin, educator and activist; first female university graduate in Australia
John Alexander Gunn, philosophy professor
Peter Karmel, former vice-chancellor of Australian National University and Flinders University
Hugh Gemmell Lamb-Smith, Australian educator; landed at Anzac Cove on 25 April 1915.
Arthur Lucas, principal of King's College London (1993–2003)
Robert Manne, professor of politics at La Trobe University
Samaresh Mitra, bioinorganic chemist, Shanti Swarup Bhatnagar laureate
Peter McPhee, Provost of the University of Melbourne
Fulvio Melia, professor of physics and astronomy at the University of Arizona and associate editor of the Astrophysical Journal
Bruce Mitchell, fellow of St Edmund Hall, Oxford
David S. Oderberg, professor of philosophy at the University of Reading
Richard G. Pestell, Executive Vice President at Thomas Jefferson University, Philadelphia USA 
Abbas Rajabifard, professor and head of the Department of Infrastructure Engineering in the Melbourne School of Engineering
Michael Roe, historian
David Shallcross, chemical engineer
James Simpson, Harvard University professor
Alexander Smits, Eugene Higgins Professor of Mechanical and Aerospace Engineering at Princeton University
John Tasioulas, Professor of Ethics and Legal Philosophy, Oxford University
Gillian Triggs, international legal academic and President of the Australian Human Rights Commission
Frances Valintine, education futurist
Sally Walker, Vice-Chancellor of Deakin University
Frank T. M. White, Foundation Professor, Mining and Metallurgical Engineering, University of Queensland; Macdonald Professor of Mining Engineering and Applied Geophysics, McGill University

Architecture 

Douglas Alexandra
James Birrell
Gregory Burgess
Peter Corrigan
Norman Day
John Denton
Roy Grounds
Ellison Harvie
John Hipwell
Peter Ho
Nonda Katsalidis
Hijjas Kasturi
Barry Patten
Louise St John Kennedy

Business 

Leigh Clifford, Chairman of Qantas
Robert Champion de Crespigny
Anthony Di Pietro, President of Melbourne Victory Football Club and CEO of Premier Fresh Australia
John Elliott, President of Liberal Party of Australia & Carlton Football Club
Aubrey Gibson
Charles Goode, Chairman of Australia & New Zealand Banking Group
James P. Gorman, Chairman and CEO of Morgan Stanley
David Hains
John Holland, founder of John Holland Group
Margaret Jackson
Ananda Krishnan, CEO, Usaha Tegas Sdn Bhd
Hugh Morgan, former board member of the Reserve Bank of Australia
Rupert Myer, director, Myer Family Company
Richard Pratt
James Riady, Chairman, Lippo Group
Graeme Samuel, 
Karl Siegling, funds manager
Peter Smedley, CEO of Colonial Group, Mayne Nickless
Evan Thornley, entrepreneur

Community activism
Julian Assange, Wikileaks spokesperson and founder (did not graduate)
Waleed Aly
Helen Durham, international humanitarian lawyer
Avery Ng, Hong Kong activist
Tilman Ruff, public health scholar and founder of International Campaign to Abolish Nuclear Weapons (ICAN), winner of the 2017 Nobel Peace Prize.

Government

Governors General of Australia
Richard Casey, Baron Casey, 16th Governor-General of Australia (did not graduate)
Sir Zelman Cowen, 
Peter Hollingworth, 
Sir Isaac Isaacs, also former Chief Justice of Australia
Sir Ninian Stephen, also a previous Justice of the High Court of Australia

Governors of Victoria
Alex Chernov, 
Professor David de Kretser
Sir James Gobbo, also a previous Justice of the Supreme Court of Victoria
John Landy
Richard McGarvie
Sir Henry Winneke, also a previous Chief Justice of Victoria

Governors of other jurisdictions

Politicians

Prime Ministers of Australia
Alfred Deakin
Julia Gillard, 
Harold Holt, 
Sir Robert Menzies,

Premiers of Victoria
Ted Baillieu
John Brumby
John Cain II
Rupert Hamer
 Sir William Irvine, also a former Chief Justice of Victoria
Joan Kirner
William Shiels
Lindsay Thompson

Premier of Queeensland
 Thomas Ryan

Federal politicians

Lyn Allison, former Member of the Australian Senate and leader of the Australian Democrats
Richard Alston, former Member of the Australian Senate
Kevin Andrews, Member of the Australian House of Representatives
Bruce Baird, former Member of the Australian House of Representatives
Maurice Blackburn, lawyer and former Member of the Australian House of Representatives
Neil Brown, former Member of the Australian House of Representatives
Anna Burke, Member of the Australian House of Representatives
John Button, former Member of the Australian Senate
Jim Cairns, former Deputy Prime Minister of Australia
Sam Cohen, former Member of the Australian Senate
Barney Cooney, former Member of the Australian Senate
Mark Dreyfus, Member of Australian House of Representatives
Gareth Evans, international policymaker, academic, and former Member of the Australian Senate
John Alexander Forrest
Petro Georgiou, former Member of Australian House of Representatives
Andrew Giles, Member of Australian House of Representatives
Ivor Greenwood, former Member of the Australian Senate
Ray Groom, former Member of the Australian House of Representatives and Premier of Tasmania
H. B. Higgins, former Attorney-General of Australia and Justice of the High Court of Australia
Greg Hunt, Member of Australian House of Representatives
 Dennis Jensen, Member of Australian House of Representatives
 Barry Jones, AC former Member of Australian House of Representatives and Parliament of Victoria. 
David Kemp, former Member of Australian House of Representatives
John Langmore, Member of Australian House of Representatives
William Maloney, Member of Australian House of Representatives
Richard Marles, Member of Australian House of Representatives 
Peter McGauran, former Member of Australian House of Representatives
Kelly O'Dwyer, Member of Australian House of Representatives
Andrew Peacock, former Member of Australian House of Representatives
Sir Arthur Robinson, former Member of Australian House of Representatives
Nicola Roxon, former Member of the Australian House of Representatives
Roger Shipton, former Member of the Australian House of Representatives
Bill Shorten, Member of Australian House of Representatives
Bruce Smith, former Member of Australian House of Representatives	
Sir John Spicer, former Member of the Australian Senate
Sid Spindler, former Member of the Australian Senate
Lindsay Tanner, former Member of the Australian House of Representatives
Ralph Willis, former Member of the Australian House of Representatives
Agar Wynne, former Member of the Australian House of Representatives

Australian state and territory politicians

Sir Clifden Eager , former President of the Victorian Legislative Council
Maurice Blackburn, lawyer and former Member of the Victorian Legislative Assembly
John Bourke, lawyer and former Member of the Victorian Legislative Assembly
Thomas Brennan, political journalist and former Member of the Victorian Legislative Council
Bruce Chamberlain, former Member of both the Victorian Legislative Assembly and Council
Robert Clark, former Member of the Victorian Legislative Assembly
Neil Cole, former Member of the Victorian Legislative Assembly and playwright and researcher
Robert Dean, former Member of the Victorian Legislative Assembly
Frank Field, former Member of the Victorian Legislative Assembly
John Galbally, former Member of both the Victorian Legislative Assembly and Council
Matthew Groom, Member of the Tasmanian House of Assembly
Ray Groom, former Premier of Tasmania and Member of the Australian House of Representatives 
Tim Holding, former Member of the Victorian Legislative Assembly
Robert Wilfred Holt, Minister for Lands in the Cain government 1952–54
Trevor Oldham, former Member of the Victorian Legislative Assembly, serving as Deputy Premier
Herbert Postle, former Member of the Tasmanian House of Assembly
Robert Ramsay, former Member of both the Victorian Legislative Assembly
Edward Reynolds, former Member of both the Victorian Legislative Assembly
T. J. Ryan, former Premier of Queensland
Sir Arthur Rylah, former Member of the Victorian Legislative Assembly and Deputy Premier
Prue Sibree, former Member of the Victorian Legislative Assembly
Oswald Snowball, former Member of the Victorian Legislative Assembly, serving as Speaker
Alan Stockdale, former Member of the Victorian Legislative Assembly, serving as Treasurer
Shane Stone, former Chief Minister of the Northern Territory
Richard Ward, former Member of the Northern Territory Legislative Council and Supreme Court judge
Sir Henry Wrixon, former Member of both the Victorian Legislative Assembly and Council	
Agar Wynne, former Member of the Victorian Legislative Council

International politicians
Kirsty Sword Gusmão, First Lady of East Timor
Ismail Abdul Rahman, former Deputy Prime Minister of Malaysia
Tajol Rosli Mohd Ghazali, former Menteri Besar of Perak
Dato' Sri Mustapa Mohamed, Member of Parliament of Jeli, former Malaysian Minister of International Trade and Industry
Baru Bian, Member of Parliament of Selangau, former Malaysian Minister of Works 
Raja Kamarul Bahrin, former Malaysian Deputy Minister of Housing and Local Government
Mark Regev, spokesman for the Israeli Prime Minister

Public servants
William Macmahon Ball, diplomat
Jean-Pierre Blais, Canadian bureaucrat; Chairman of the Canadian Radio-television and Telecommunications Commission
Peta Credlin, political advisor
Francis Patrick Donovan, diplomat and jurist
Bill Paterson, Australian Ambassador to Republic of Korea; previously Australian Ambassador to Thailand and Australian Ambassador for Counter-Terrorism
 Trevor Ashmore Pyman, diplomat.
John So, Lord Mayor of Melbourne
Fred Whitlam, Crown Solicitor; father of Gough

Humanities

Arts 
 Angela Brennan, artist
 Steve Cox, painter and watercolourist
 John Dahlsen, environmental artist
 Hugh Davies, mixed media artist
 Bill Henson, photographer and Venice Biennale representative
 Ali Hogg, photographer and activist
 Pamela Irving, artist and educator
 Anastasia Klose, video artist and Biennale of Sydney representative
 Doris McKellar, photographer
 Azlan McLennan, artist and activist
 Lewis Miller, Archibald Prize winning painter
Victor O'Connor, artist
 Stieg Persson, painter
 Patricia Piccinini, sculptor and Venice Biennale representative
 Van Thanh Rudd, artist and activist
Anne-Louise Sarks, theatre director and writer
Matt Scholten, theatre director, teacher & writer
 Ricky Swallow, sculptor and Venice Biennale representative
 Timothy James Webb, artist
 Bradd Westmoreland, artist
 Marcus Wills, Archibald Prize winning painter
 Shaun Parker, Award-Winning Choreographer, founder of Shaun Parker & Company

Film and television

 Adam Arkapaw, cinematographer (True Detective, Animal Kingdom, Snowtown)
 Gillian Armstrong, director (Charlotte Gray, Little Women)
 Tony Ayres, Australian Film Institute award-winning director (The Home Song Stories, Walking on Water)
 Alison Bell, Australian Academy of Cinema and Television Arts Award nominated actor (I Rock, Laid)
Tahir Raj Bhasin, Indian actor 
 Jill Bilcock, Academy Award-nominated editor (Elizabeth, Moulin Rouge!, Red Dog)
Hamish Blake, comedian (did not graduate)
Cate Blanchett, actress (did not graduate)
 Jamie Blanks, director (Urban Legend, Valentine)
John Bluthal, actor
 Sibylla Budd, actor and documentary presenter (All Saints, Sea Patrol, The Secret Life of Us)
Ronny Chieng, comedian
Santo Cilauro, television and feature film producer
 Vince Colosimo, Australian Film Institute Award winning actor (Body of Lies, Chopper, Lantana)
Marg Downey, comedian and actress
Elizabeth Debicki, actress
 Adam Elliot, Academy Award-winning animator (Harvie Krumpet, Mary and Max)
Alice Garner, historian, musician and actress
Antony I. Ginnane, film producer
Tom Gleisner, director, producer, writer, comedian, actor and author
Libbi Gorr, comedian
Hanna Griffiths, Award Winning Film Producer & Actress 
Barry Humphries, comedian 
Red Hong Yi, artist and architectural designer
Sammy J, comedian
 Clayton Jacobson, director (Kenny)
 Justin Kurzel, director (Snowtown, Macbeth (2015), Assassin's Creed) 
Andy Lee, comedian
 Anthony Lucas, Academy Award nominated animator (The Mysterious Geographic Explorations of Jasper Morello)
 Robert Luketic, director (21, Legally Blonde, Monster-in-Law)
Catherine Mack-Hancock, actress
 Lara Jean Marshall, actress best known for her role on The Saddle Club
 Belinda McClory, actor and screenwriter (Acolytes, Blue Heelers, The Matrix)
 David Michôd, director (Animal Kingdom)
 Rhys Muldoon, actor
Lloyd Newson, director, dancer and choreographer
 Michael Pattinson, producer (Ground Zero, Secrets)
 Hannie Rayson, Australian Writers' Guild Award and Sidney Myer Performing Arts Award winning playwright and actor (SeaChange)
Glenn Robbins, comedian and actor
Portia de Rossi, actress
Pallavi Sharda, Indian actor
 Jonathan M. Shiff, Australian Film Institute and British Academy of Film and Television Arts award-winning producer (Ocean Girl, Thunderstone)
Rob Sitch, co-writer and co-director of the movies The Castle and The Dish; co-host of The Panel
 Matt Scholten, Director
 Simon Stone, Director & Actor
 Sam Strong, Director, Artistic Director Queensland Theatre
Magda Szubanski, comedian and actress
 Nadia Townsend, actor and theatre director (City Homicide, Fireflies, Knowing)
 Andrew Upton, Director & Playwright
Steve Vizard, television and radio presenter, lawyer, comedian, producer, author and screenwriter
 Luke Walker, director/producer (Beyond Our Ken, Lasseter's Bones)
 Sarah Watt, director and animator (Look Both Ways, My Year Without Sex)
Angela White, pornographic actress, director
 Alison Whyte, Logie Award-winning actor (Frontline, Satisfaction)
 Geoffrey Wright, director (Macbeth (2006), Metal Skin, Romper Stomper)
 Julia Zemiro, Television Presenter
 Randeep Hooda, Indian Actor 
 Yashma Gill, Pakistani Actor 
 Lydia Zimmermann, director (Aro Tolbukhin. En la mente del asesino)
 Ashley Zukerman, Logie Award nominated actor (Lowdown, The Pacific, Rush)

History 
Geoffrey Blainey, one of the Australian Living Treasures
Manning Clark
Charles Coppel, former barrister and historian
Keith Hancock
Stuart Macintyre
Michael Roe, historian and academic
A. G. L. Shaw

Journalism
Tiffiny Hall, journalist, author and television personality 
Joe Hildebrand, journalist, social commentator and news columnist
Christine Kenneally, New York City-based journalist
Matt Tinney, newsreader
Bill Tipping, former journalist, social commentator and activist

Literature, writing and poetry 
Randa Abdel-Fattah, Australian Muslim author and lawyer
Russell Blackford, writer, philosopher and critic
Vincent Buckley
Anna Ciddor, author and illustrator 
Helen Garner, author
Kerry Greenwood, crime writer
Germaine Greer, feminist writer and academic
Jack Hibberd
Fulvio Melia
Gerald Murnane, novelist and short story writer
Chris Wallace-Crabbe, Visiting Professor of Australian Studies at Harvard University
Lynne Kelly (science writer), writer, researcher and science educator

Music

 Harry James Angus, trumpeter and vocalist (The Cat Empire)
Wouter De Backer, musician known as 'Gotye'
 Cheryl Barker, opera singer
 Michael Barker, drummer (John Butler Trio, Split Enz)
 Don Banks, composer
 Nicole Car, opera singer
 Arthur Chanter 1866–1950, composer
 Diana Doherty, oboe soloist (New York Philharmonic)
Leonard Dommett, violinist and conductor
Julian Gavin, opera singer
 Antoinette Halloran, opera singer
 Phil Harvey, creative director (Coldplay)
Missy Higgins, singer/songwriter
Rex Hobcroft, pianist and administrator
Tania de Jong, soprano and social entrepreneur
 Liza Lim, composer
 John McAll, pianist and Musical Director
Mona McBurney 1867–1932 composer
 Ryan Monro, bassist (The Cat Empire)
 Ian Munro, pianist and composer
 Patrick Savage, film composer and former principal first violin (Royal Philharmonic Orchestra)
Peter Sculthorpe, composer
Dudley Simpson, conductor and television composer
Jan Skubiszewski, multi-award-winning record producer film composer 
Red Symons, musician, television and radio personality
Penelope Thwaites, musicologist and pianist
Yelian He, cellist
Charles Zwar, songwriter, composer, lyricist, pianist and music director
David Burd, US rapper, known as Lil Dicky

Philosophy 

Samuel Alexander
Leslie Cannold
Raimond Gaita
Charles Leonard Hamblin
Frank Cameron Jackson
Graham Oppy
Toby Ord
Brian O'Shaughnessy
Graham Priest
Ian Robinson
Peter Singer
John Tasioulas, moral and legal philosopher
Nick Trakakis
John Weckert
Damon Young

Law

Chief Justices of Australia
 Sir Owen Dixon, 
 Sir Frank Gavan Duffy, 
 Sir Isaac Isaacs, 
 Sir John Latham, 

 Justices of the High Court of Australia 
Sir Keith Aickin, former justice
Susan Crennan
Sir Daryl Dawson, former justice
Sir Wilfred Fullagar, former justice
Kenneth Hayne
H. B. Higgins, former justice
Sir Douglas Menzies, former justice
Geoffrey Nettle
Sir Ninian Stephen, also a previous Governor-General of Australia

Chief Justice of the Federal Court of Australia
 Michael Black, former Chief Justice

Justices of the Federal Court of Australia
Geoffrey Giudice
Sir Edward Woodward, also served as a Royal Commissioner and Director-General of Security

Chief Justice of the Family Court of Australia
 Diana Bryant, Chief Justice since 2004
 Alastair Nicholson, former Chief Justice

Justices of the Family Court of Australia
 Linda Dessau, former justice

Chief Justices of Victoria
 Lieutenant General Sir Edmund Herring, also a former Lieutenant Governor of Victoria
 Sir William Irvine, also a former Premier of Victoria
 Sir John Madden, also a former Vice-Chancellor and Chancellor of the University
 Sir Frederick Mann, also a former Lieutenant Governor of Victoria
 John Harber Phillips, also a former Victorian Director of Public Prosecutions and Director of the National Crime Authority
 Sir Henry Winneke, also a former Governor of Victoria
 Sir John Young, 

Justices of the Supreme Court of Victoria
 Sir Kevin Anderson, 
 Sir Arthur Dean, 
Sir James Gobbo, also a former Governor of Victoria
 Sir George Pape
 Joseph Santamaria 

Presidents of the Victorian Court of Appeal
 Chris Maxwell
 John Winneke,

Other legal professionals 
Philip Alston, international law scholar; former United Nations Special Rapporteur
John Bennett, civil libertarian 
Matthew Collins, barrister and Senior Fellow at the Melbourne Law School 
Mario Condello, lawyer; murdered during Melbourne gangland killings
Frank Costigan, lawyer, Royal Commissioner and social justice activist
Rowan Downing, barrister and international jurist
Frank Galbally, criminal defence lawyer
Flos Greig, first woman to be admitted to practise as a barrister and solicitor in Australia
Philip Griffiths, jurist
Francis Gurry, international intellectual property lawyer and bureaucrat
Colin Lovitt, criminal barrister

Julian McMahon, A.C., barrister, humanitarian, campaigner against death penalty
Rob Stary, criminal defence lawyer
Lord Uthwatt, Judge, Chancery Division, High Court of Justice of England and Wales, Lord of Appeal in Ordinary, House of Lords
Kissana Phathanacharoen, Deputy Commander of Cyber Crime Investigation Bureau and Deputy Spokesman of the Royal Thai Police

Military

 Group Captain John Balmer, World War II RAAF bomber pilot
 Major General Sir Julius Bruche, Second Boer War and World War I army officer
Sir Samuel Burston, army doctor and World War II general
Rupert Downes, army doctor and World War II general
Sir Edward 'Weary' Dunlop, army doctor and humanitarian
 Major General Harold 'Pompey' Elliott, politician and World War I army general
Sir Neil Hamilton Fairley, army doctor
Brigadier General William Grant, World War I general
Sir James Whiteside McCay, politician and World War I general
Sir John Monash, World War I general
Sir Kingsley Norris, army doctor and major general
Lieutenant Colonel Philip Rhoden, lawyer and World War II army officer
Ian Upjohn, Army Reserve officer and barrister

Religious leaders

Rabbi Raymond Apple

Sciences

Agriculture 
 Yvonne Aitken, botanist, first woman to earn a PhD in Agriculture form the University of Melbourne in 1970

Biology
Elizabeth Blackburn, awarded the Nobel Prize in Medicine in 2009
Margaret Blackwood, botanist and geneticist
Kirsten Parris, urban ecologist
Grant Sutherland, human geneticist

Computing
Andrew Freeman FACS – Fellow of the Australian Computer Society (elected in 1997), and an Honorary Life Member (HLM) of the ACS (elected in 2018)

Geology
 Norman Greenwood

Chemistry
Cyril Callister, creator of Vegemite
Beryl Splatt
Shu Jie Lam
Dr Ruth Wilson

Engineering 
 Sir Walter Bassett
 William Charles Kernot
 Diane Lemaire, first woman to graduate from the University of Melbourne with a degree in engineering
 Anthony Michell
 John Monash
 Elizabeth Jens
 Ian A. Young, senior fellow of Intel; co-inventor of BiCMOS logic family and clocks for Pentium series microprocessors
 Frank Caruso

Mathematics 

 Robert Bartnik
 Keith Briggs
 Danny Calegari
 Robert William Chapman
 Thomas MacFarland Cherry
 Ian G. Enting
 Greg Hjorth
 Mark S. Joshi
 Kenneth McIntyre
 Brendan McKay
 Samuel McLaren
 John Henry Michell
 Edward J. Nanson
 Jonathan Pila
 E. J. G. Pitman
 J. Hyam Rubinstein
 Hans Schwerdtfeger
 Ian Sloan
 Geoffrey Watson
 William Parkinson Wilson

Medicine 
Lilian Helen Alexander, one of the first women to study medicine at the university
Ellen Balaam, first woman surgeon in Melbourne
David Bowen, deregistered medical practitioner
Marjorie Bick, biochemist
Vera Scantlebury Brown
Sir Frank Macfarlane Burnet, awarded the Nobel Prize in Medicine in 1960 "for the discovery that the immune system of the fetus learns how to distinguish between self and non-self"
Sir John Carew Eccles, awarded the Nobel Prize in Medicine in 1963 "for describing the electric transmission of impulses along nerves"
Aditya Tedjaseputra, inventor of pain-free speculum
Constance Ellis, first woman to receive a Doctor of Medicine from the university
Mavis Freeman, bacteriologist and biochemist
Jane Stocks Greig, public health specialist
Janet Greig, Victoria's first female anaesthetist
David Handelsman, Australia's first professor in reproductive endocrinology and andrology
James Lawson, public health doctor and scientist
Elizabeth Scarr, associate professor at the Department of Psychiatry, project leader of Cooperative Research Centre for Mental Health, and leader of the Psychiatric Neuropathology laboratory at the university
Helen Sexton, surgeon, one of the first women to study medicine at the university
Rajaratnam Sundarason, surgeon, one of the founders of International House
 Sydney James Van Pelt, pioneer of modern hypnotherapy

Physics 

 Nicole Bell
 Walter Boas
 Samuel L. Braunstein
 John M. Cowley
 Rod Crewther
 Richard Dalitz – inventor of the Dalitz plot
 Terence James Elkins
 Colin J. Gillespie
 Kerr Grant
 Peter Hannaford
 Alan Head
 T. H. Laby
 Rodney Marks
 Leslie H. Martin  
 Sir Harrie Massey
 Fulvio Melia
 Keith Nugent
 Helen Quinn – former president of the American Physical Society; recipient of the Dirac Medal in 2000 and the Sakurai Prize in 2013
 William Sutherland

Psychology
 Vicki Anderson (psychologist), pediatric neuropsychologist
 Kathleen Funder, researcher, Australian Institute of Family Studies
 Peter O'Connor (psychologist), psychologist

Veterinary Science 
 Cyril Seelenmeyer – VFL footballer, veterinary surgeon, winner of Military Cross
 Harold Addison Woodruff – Professor of veterinary pathology and director of the veterinary institute

Sport 

 Kim Crow, London Olympics silver and bronze medallist for doubles and singles sculling respectively
 Eva Duldig (born 1938), Austrian-born Australian and Dutch tennis player, author
 Bev Francis, IFBB professional Australian female bodybuilder, powerlifter, and national shot put champion
 Geoff Grover, VFL and VFA footballer; VFA interstate representative (1966 Hobart Carnival)
 John Robinson, VFL Footballer; recipient of the Distinguished Conduct Medal (1917)

Faculty

 Joshua Thomas Noble Anderson
 Peter Baines, geophysicist
 Lisa Cameron
 Henri Daniel Rathgeber
 Jocelyn Hyslop, inaugural Director of Social Studies
 Josephine Forbes, Principal Research Fellow, Department of Medicine
 Dolly Kikon, School of Social and Political Sciences

Administration

Chancellors

Vice-Chancellors

References

External links 
Prominent alumni – from the University of Melbourne website

Melbourne
University